Carex vestita, also commonly known as velvet sedge, is a tussock-forming species of perennial sedge in the family Cyperaceae. It is native to eastern parts of the United States.

Description
The sedge has long creeping rhizomes and forms large colonies. There are reddish to purple coloured basal sheaths under the leaves. The leaves meet the stem forming a  a membranous scale, or ligule, on the inner side of the leaf sheath.

Taxonomy
The species was first formally described by the botanist Carl Ludwig Willdenow in 1805 as a part of the work Species Plantarum.
It has one synonym; Loxotrema vestita.

Distribution
C.vestita is mostly found growing in temperate biomes down in the eastern states of the United States. It is found from Maine in the north east the south to Alabama in the south west and North Carolina in the south east.

See also
List of Carex species

References

vestita
Taxa named by Carl Ludwig Willdenow
Plants described in 1805
Flora of Connecticut
Flora of Alabama
Flora of Maine
Flora of Delaware
Flora of Massachusetts
Flora of Maryland
Flora of New Hampshire
Flora of New Jersey
Flora of New York (state)
Flora of North Carolina
Flora of Pennsylvania
Flora of Rhode Island
Flora of Tennessee
Flora of Virginia